Werner Lucas Maier (born 1966 in Bad Hersfeld) is a former German American football player. He has been president of the Munich Cowboys since 2006.

Biography 
Maier moved to Munich in 1981. After finishing his secondary education with the abitur in 1987 he studied jurisprudence at the University of Augsburg and at the Ludwig Maximilian University of Munich.

After moving to Munich he started playing football in the Munich Rangers' youth team. From 1985 to 1995 he played in the German Football League, and was also team captain in 1992, when the team placed second in 1993, when they won the German Bowl. During his years of study he also worked as an editorial assistant of American football for some TV broadcasters, and later as a football referee and university sports speaker of flag football. Apart from that he organized separate football events.

Maier has been working as a lawyer in his own firm since 1997.

References 

1966 births
Living people
People from Bad Hersfeld
Sportspeople from Kassel (region)
German players of American football
German Football League players
American football officials
21st-century German lawyers
Ludwig Maximilian University of Munich alumni
University of Augsburg alumni